Overthrow: America's Century of Regime Change from Hawaii to Iraq is a book published in 2006 by New York Times foreign correspondent and author Stephen Kinzer about the United States's involvement in the overthrow of foreign governments from the late 19th century to the present. According to Kinzer, the first such instance was the overthrow of the Kingdom of Hawaii in 1893, and continuing to America-led invasion of Iraq in 2003. His examples include mini-histories of the U.S.-supported or encouraged coups d'état in Hawaii, Cuba, Puerto Rico, the Philippines, Nicaragua, Honduras, Iran, Guatemala, South Vietnam, Chile, Grenada, Panama, Afghanistan, and Iraq.

Some examples used in the book refer to American support for local rebels against the existing national governments that led to a change in power. For example, in 1898, the United States helped to overthrow the government of Cuba by supporting local rebels who were already fighting their government. In other circumstances, such as in Iran, Guatemala, and Chile, Kinzer argues the United States initiated, planned and orchestrated the regime change.

This book talks about things such as how the United States, during its first real coup, decided to remove Nicaraguan President Zelaya from power, over the objections of officials like the United States Ambassador to Nicaragua, Finnegan Courtney, because they wanted the power of the canal. It also says that the United States tricked the Panamanians into independence from Colombia so that they could have the land to build the Panama Canal, and Colombia would not give them the land.

Reception
Publishers Weekly wrote that Kinzer "makes a persuasive case that U.S. intervention destabilizes world politics and often leaves countries worse off than they were before."

Kirkus Reviews called it a "sobering and saddening book."

References

External links
Overthrow at Archive.org  
Official website for book from Henry Holt(Dead Link)
"Empirical Evidence", on WNYC's The Brian Lehrer Show, April 26, 2006
"Author Kinzer Charts 'Century of Regime Change'", on NPR's Fresh Air, April 5, 2006
"Part 1: Overthrow: America's Century of Regime Change from Hawaii to Iraq", on Democracy Now!, April 21, 2006 (video, audio, and print transcript)
"Part 2: Overthrow: America's Century of Regime Change from Hawaii to Iraq", on Democracy Now!, May 8, 2006 (video, audio, and print transcript)
Interview of Stephen Kinzer in Guernica Magazine
 Interview with Stephen Kinzer about Overthrow
 Interview with Stephen Kinzer hosted by the World Affairs Council of Northern California
Presentation by Kinzer on Overthrow, April 10, 2006, C-SPAN
Presentation by Kinzer on Overthrow, June 4, 2006, C-SPAN

2006 non-fiction books
Books by Stephen Kinzer
Times Books books
Books about coups d'état
Non-fiction books about the Central Intelligence Agency
Books about foreign relations of the United States
United States involvement in regime change
Books about the Middle East
Books about Latin America
Cuba–United States relations
Philippines–United States relations
Nicaragua–United States relations
Honduras–United States relations
Iran–United States relations
Guatemala–United States relations
United States–Vietnam relations
Chile–United States relations
Grenada–United States relations
Panama–United States relations
Afghanistan–United States relations
Iraq–United States relations
Books about Hawaii